Mandaguari is a municipality in the state of Paraná in the Southern Region of Brazil. Before World War II "Mandaguari" was called "Lovat".

See also
List of municipalities in Paraná

References

Municipalities in Paraná